The following is a list of by-elections held for the Uttarakhand Legislative Assembly, India, since its formation in 2002.

2002–2007

2007–2012

2012–2017

2017–2022

2022–2027

See also
Elections in Uttarakhand
List of Indian state legislative assembly elections

References

External links
  

 
2020s in Uttarakhand
2010s in Uttarakhand
2000s in Uttarakhand
By-elections in Uttarakhand
By-elections in India